Come By Me is  a big band album by American artist Harry Connick Jr., released in 1999, eight years after his previous big band recording, Blue Light, Red Light.

Connick and his Big Band went on a year-long world tour (the U.S., Europe, Japan and Australia), in support of the album.

Track listing
"Nowhere With Love" (Harry Connick Jr.) – 3:57
"Come By Me" (Connick) – 4:01
"Charade" (Henry Mancini, Johnny Mercer) – 3:40
"Change Partners" (Irving Berlin) – 5:43
"Easy for You to Say" (Connick) – 4:54
"Time After Time" (Sammy Cahn, Jule Styne) – 5:30
"Next Door Blues" (Connick) – 4:11
"You'd Be So Easy to Love" (Cole Porter) – 3:06
"There's No Business Like Show Business" (Berlin) – 4:48
"A Moment With Me" (Connick) – 4:26
"Danny Boy" (Frederick Weatherly) – 5:15
"Cry Me a River" (Arthur Hamilton) – 4:46
"Love for Sale" (Porter) – 8:29

Japan bonus track
"Just a Closer Walk With Thee" (Sallie Martin)

France bonus track
"Parle Plus Bas" (Boris Bergman, Nino Rota)

Personnel 

Harry Connick Jr. – Vocals, Piano, Arranger, Orchestration
Peter Doell – Engineer
Tracey Freeman – Producer
Ryan Hewitt – Engineer
Vladimir Meller – Mastering
Charles Paakkari – Engineer
Gregg Rubin – Engineer, Mixing

Charts
Come By Me made the first position in the Jazz charts in 1999, and was number 36 on the Billboard 200.

Certifications

Awards and nominations
Grammy nomination for Best Traditional Pop Vocal Performance.

1999 albums
Harry Connick Jr. albums
Columbia Records albums